Wrzawy  is a village in the administrative district of Gmina Gorzyce, within Tarnobrzeg County, Subcarpathian Voivodeship, in south-eastern Poland.

The village has a population of 1,572.

Wrzawy is the birthplace of the former First Lady of Poland (1995-2005), Jolanta Kwaśniewska.

References

Wrzawy